Dolgaec is a village in the municipality of Dolneni, North Macedonia. The population of the village was massacred in the First World War, by the Internal Macedonian Revolutionary Organization due to their Serboman affiliations.

Demographics
According to the 2021 census, the village had a total of 41 inhabitants. Ethnic groups in the village include:

Macedonians 39
Others 2

References

Villages in Dolneni Municipality